The Very Best of Gloria Estefan is the sixth compilation album released by American singer Gloria Estefan, but is the twenty-seventh album overall, released in 2006.

Track listing

Chart positions
This compilation received a limited release, and made a performance at charts, only in the UK, Switzerland and Ireland.

Certifications

References

2006 compilation albums
Gloria Estefan compilation albums
Albums produced by Emilio Estefan